Periconia elegans is a species of sac fungi in the order Pleosporales.

References

External links 

  
 Periconia elegans at Mycobank

Pleosporales
Fungi described in 1958